Face in the Rain is a 1963 film by Irvin Kershner.

Plot

Cast

External links
 
 
 

American independent films
1963 films
American black-and-white films
Films directed by Irvin Kershner
Films scored by Richard Markowitz
1960s English-language films
1960s American films